lftp is a command-line program client for several file transfer protocols. lftp is designed for Unix and Unix-like operating systems. It was developed by Alexander Lukyanov, and is distributed under the GNU General Public License.

lftp can transfer files via FTP, FTPS, HTTP, HTTPS, FISH, SFTP, BitTorrent, and FTP over HTTP proxy. It also supports the File eXchange Protocol (FXP), which allows the client to transfer files from one remote FTP server to another.

Among lftp's features are transfer queues, segmented file transfer, resuming partial downloads, bandwidth throttling, and recursive copying of file directories. The client can be used interactively or automated with scripts. It has Unix shell-like job control, and a facility for scheduling file transfers for execution at a later time.

Development history
lftp was initially developed as part of the ftpclass package. Subsequently it grew and became a more capable program (e.g., mirroring capability was added), and was renamed to lftp in February 1997. The initial goals of development were robustness, automatic resuming of transfers, and increasing transfer speed by transferring parts of a file in parallel using several connections as well as by protocol pipelining. Version 2.0 introduced HTTP and IPv6 support in 1999, more protocols were added later.

See also

 NcFTP
 Comparison of FTP client software

Notes

References 

 Dee-Ann LeBlanc (May 22, 2003) Moving Files In Linux: lftp, LinuxPlanet
 Richard Petersen, Fedora 10 Linux Desktop, Surfing Turtle Press, 2008, p. 255
 Michael Jang, Linux annoyances for geeks, O'Reilly Media, 2006, pp. 127–128
 Ellen Siever, Stephen Figgins, Robert Love, Arnold Robbins, Linux in a Nutshell, Edition 6, O'Reilly Media, 2009, pp. 244–247

Further reading
 Dmitri Popov (December 4, 2007) CLI Magic: Quick and easy backup with lftp, Linux.com

External links
 
 lftp man page
 lftp-vi: a module that adds editing capability to lftp
 LftpFS – filesystem based on FUSE and lftp

Free FTP clients
Hypertext Transfer Protocol clients
SSH File Transfer Protocol clients
Files transferred over shell clients
Free BitTorrent clients
BitTorrent clients for Linux